Sharaf may refer to:

People
 Sharaf (name), list of people with the name

Places
 Sharaf, Kermanshah, Iran
 Sharaf, Lorestan, Iran
 Sharaf, Yemen

Other uses
 Sharaf (Bedouin), an honor code among the Bedouin
 Sharaf (magazine) (1882–1891), Persian-language magazine
 Sharaf (novel), 1997 novel by the Egyptian writer Sonallah Ibrahim
 Sharaf Order (Azerbaijani: Şərəf ordeni), the Order of Pride, Azerbaijan
 Pencak Silat Sharaf, a Muslim martial art

See also
 Ash sharaf (disambiguation)
 5543 Sharaf, a minor planet
 Sharaf al-Din (disambiguation)